The 2018 Eastbourne International (also known as the Nature Valley International for sponsorship reasons) is a combined men's and women's tennis tournament played on outdoor grass courts. It was the 44th edition of the event for the women and the 8th edition for the men. The tournament is classified as a WTA Premier tournament on the 2018 WTA Tour and as an ATP World Tour 250 series on the 2018 ATP World Tour. The event took place at the Devonshire Park Lawn Tennis Club in Eastbourne, United Kingdom 25–30 June 2018.

Points and prize money

Point distribution

Prize money

ATP singles main-draw entrants

Seeds

 1 Rankings are as of 18 June 2018.

Other entrants
The following players received wildcards into the main draw:
  Andy Murray
  Cameron Norrie
  Stan Wawrinka

The following players received entry from the qualifying draw:
  Matteo Berrettini
  Daniel Brands
  Alex de Minaur
  Roberto Quiroz

The following player received entry as a lucky loser:
  Jay Clarke

Withdrawals
  Alexandr Dolgopolov → replaced by  Nicolás Jarry
  Márton Fucsovics → replaced by  Jay Clarke
  Peter Gojowczyk → replaced by  Marco Cecchinato
  Filip Krajinović → replaced by  Taylor Fritz
  Feliciano López → replaced by  Lukáš Lacko
  Tennys Sandgren → replaced by  Gilles Simon

ATP doubles main-draw entrants

Seeds

1 Rankings are as of 18 June 2018.

Other entrants
The following pairs received wildcards into the doubles main draw:
  Luke Bambridge /  Jonny O'Mara
  Scott Clayton /  Joe Salisbury

WTA singles main-draw entrants

Seeds

 1 Rankings are as of 18 June 2018.

Other entrants
The following players received wildcards into the main draw:
  Harriet Dart
  Samantha Stosur
  Katie Swan
  Heather Watson

The following players received entry from the qualifying draw:
  Kateryna Bondarenko
  Kurumi Nara
  Kristýna Plíšková
  Yulia Putintseva
  Andrea Sestini Hlaváčková
  Natalia Vikhlyantseva

The following player received entry as a lucky loser:
  Sachia Vickery

Withdrawals
  Catherine Bellis → replaced by  Alison Van Uytvanck
  Simona Halep → replaced by  Hsieh Su-wei
  Naomi Osaka → replaced by  Kaia Kanepi
  Lesia Tsurenko → replaced by  Sachia Vickery
  Elena Vesnina → replaced by  Donna Vekić

WTA doubles main-draw entrants

Seeds

1 Rankings are as of 18 June 2018.

Other entrants
The following pair received a wildcard into the doubles main draw:
  Harriet Dart /  Katy Dunne

Finals

Men's singles

 Mischa Zverev defeated  Lukáš Lacko, 6–4, 6–4

Women's singles

  Caroline Wozniacki defeated  Aryna Sabalenka 7–5, 7–6(7–5)

Men's doubles

  Luke Bambridge /  Jonny O'Mara defeated  Ken Skupski /  Neal Skupski, 7–5, 6–4

Women's doubles

  Gabriela Dabrowski /  Xu Yifan defeated  Irina-Camelia Begu /  Mihaela Buzărnescu 6–3, 7–5

References

External links
 Website

2018 in English tennis
2018 WTA Tour
2018
June 2018 sports events in the United Kingdom